Demigod are a Finnish death metal band formed in 1990 in Loimaa, Finland. The band's debut album Slumber of Sullen Eyes is highly regarded in the heavy metal community. Terrorizer included it in their list of "40 death metal albums that you must hear", commenting: "It is with this often overlooked classic that one of the greatest love stories of all time unfolded: Florida's pummeling groove meets Sweden's buzzsaw guitar work in a union so deliciously evil it could move the hardest of bangers to tears of joy."

History
Demigod was a popular group in the death metal underground of the 1990s; however, despite a steady status and a healthy number of gigs, the band split up in the mid-90s. Demigod re-formed in 1998 and was eventually signed by Spikefarm, a sublabel of major Finnish metal record company Spinefarm, who released the band's second album Shadow Mechanics. 

Somewhere between 2002 and 2006, this co-operation came to an end, and the band recorded the follow-up to Shadow Mechanics without a label. The recordings were finished in the summer of 2006, and the album was released by the band's own label, Open Game Productions, in 2007. Since late 2007, worldwide distribution has been handled by the Spanish label Xtreem Music, leaving only the Scandinavian market for the band's own label. Xtreem Music has also re-released the debut album, previously long out of print.

In 2012, Esa Linden and several of the other "Slumber of Sullen Eyes" members took part in several reunion shows. After the string of shows was brought to a close, the band intended to begin writing another album.

Members

Current
Esa Lindén - vocals (1990-1994, 1997-2001, 2010-present), guitar (1990-1993)
Jussi Kiiski - guitars (1991-2008, 2010-present)
Tuomas Karppinen - guitars (2007-2008, 2010-present)
Sami Vesanto - bass (1993-2008, 2010-present)
Tuomo Latvala - drums (2002-2008, 2010-present)

Former
Seppo Taatila - drums (1990-2002)
Tero Laitinen - bass (1990-1993), guitar (1994-2007)
Mika Haapasalo - guitar (1992), vocals (1994-1997)
Tuomas Ala-Nissilä - vocals (2001-2008)
Ali Leiniö - vocals (2001)

Timeline

Discography 
 Unholy Domain (Demo, 1991)
 Slumber of Sullen Eyes (1992)
 Shadow Mechanics (Spikefarm, 2002)
 Let Chaos Prevail (Open Game/Xtreem, 2007)

References

External links 
 Demigod's official site

Finnish death metal musical groups
Finnish heavy metal musical groups
Musical groups established in 1990
Musical groups disestablished in 2008